Nigel Trevor Plews (5 September 1934 – 19 October 2008) was a cricket umpire, who stood in first-class and international level matches. He was born in Nottingham.

Plews was unusual for a top-level English umpire, in that he was one of only four umpires who have stood in Tests in England since World War II who did not play first-class cricket. He stood in 11 Test matches between 1988 and 1995.

He took up umpiring full-time after retiring from a 25-year career with the Nottingham city police force, where he was a detective sergeant  – he was nicknamed "Serge" on the field –  in the Fraud Squad.

He also stood in 16 One Day International matches and officiated at 11 Tests before retiring. Plews died of renal cancer on 19 October 2008.

See also
 List of Test cricket umpires
 List of One Day International cricket umpires

References

1934 births
2008 deaths
Officers in English police forces
Cricketers from Nottingham
Deaths from kidney cancer
English One Day International cricket umpires
English Test cricket umpires